Newton County Courthouse is a historic county courthouse in Courthouse Square in Covington, Georgia, the county seat of Newton County, Georgia. The courthouse was designed by Bruce & Morgan in a Second Empire architecture style and built in 1884. It was constructed on the same site as a previouse county courthouse building that burned down on December 31, 1883. The building was added to the National Register of Historic Places on September 18, 1980.

The courthouse features in two postcards from around 1907.

See also
National Register of Historic Places listings in Newton County, Georgia

References

County courthouses in Georgia (U.S. state)
Courthouses on the National Register of Historic Places in Georgia (U.S. state)
Buildings and structures in Newton County, Georgia
Government buildings completed in 1884
Second Empire architecture in Georgia (U.S. state)
National Register of Historic Places in Newton County, Georgia